Richard Pope Griffith is a former professional American football player who played tight end for seven seasons for the New England Patriots and the Jacksonville Jaguars.

College career
Griffith was a four-year starter for the University of Arizona Wildcats. He caught 26 passes for 363 yards and two touchdowns in his college career. He was named to the All-Pac-10 team following his senior year.

Professional football

New England Patriots
Griffith was selected by New England in the fifth round of the 1993 NFL Draft.

Jacksonville Jaguars
Griffith signed with the Jaguars in January 1995 as a veteran free agent and was a member of the Jaguars inaugural team. He retired from football in 2001.  His primary job as a member of the Jaguars was that of a long snapper.

Personal life
Following his NFL career, Griffith took a position as the Northeast Florida area director of the Fellowship of Christian Athletes. He is currently the Woodmen Heights Campus Pastor at Woodmen Valley Chapel in Colorado Springs, Colorado.

References

1969 births
Living people
People from Batesville, Arkansas
American football tight ends
Arizona Wildcats football players
New England Patriots players
Jacksonville Jaguars players
Players of American football from Arkansas